San Girolamo della Carità is a church in Rome, Italy, located near the Palazzo Farnese and Campo de' Fiori.

History
According to tradition, this is the site of the domus of the matron Saint Paola who hosted Saint Jerome when he served as secretary to Pope Damasus. Later it was transformed into a small church dedicated to him.

In 1419 the Franciscan Observants built a hospice with a chapel, which they replaced with a new church in 1508. In 1524 it was taken over by the Archconfraternita della Carità ("Archconfraternity of Charity"), founded by Giulio de' Medici (later Pope Clement VII) in 1519; a society of noblemen from Florence. Philip Neri lived in the hospice from 1551 to 1583. It served as a first meeting place for the Oratorians founded in 1561 before they were established as a Congregation in 1575 and, in the same year, given the church of Santa Maria in Vallicella.

A fire destroyed the hospice in 1631, damaging the church. In 1632 Cardinal Francesco Barberini, protector of the Archconfraternity, commissioned the architect Francesco Peparelli to renovate the hospice, which remained in operation until 1840, when the building was re-adapted into a convent connected to the church. The church, was rebuilt in 1657 by Domenico Castelli, with a Baroque façade by Carlo Rainaldi.

Interior
The altarpiece for the high altar is a copy of Domenichino's The Last Communion of Saint Jerome (Domenichino). The original, commissioned for San Girolamo in 1612, is now in the Pinacoteca Vaticana.

The first chapel to the right (Cappella Spada), although originally assigned to Orazio Spada in 1575, was refurbished by Virgilio and Bernardino Spada in 1654-57. As a friend of Virgilio, the name of the Baroque architect Francesco Borromini has long been associated with the chapel but it has been argued that the overall design was probably directed by Virgilio Spada. The altar rail is by Gianlorenzo Bernini's pupil, Antonio Giorgetti.

The  small but superbly finished Antamoro Chapel is dedicated to S. Filippo Neri. The chapel itself was designed by Filippo Juvarra, the only work of his in Rome, and constructed in 1708-1709. The decoration of the chapel with the back lit statue of The Ecstasy of S. Filippo Neri and two stucco reliefs in the ceiling was conceived by Juvarra in intimate cooperation with his close friend, the French sculptor Pierre Le Gros, who was responsible for carrying out the sculptural components.

Cardinal-Deacons

Giulio Bevilacqua, C.O.  (25 February 1965 - 6 May 1965) 
Antonio Riberi (26 June 1967 - 16 December 1967) 
Paolo Bertoli (30 April 1969 - 5 March 1973) 
Pietro Palazzini (12 December 1974 - 11 October 2000) 
Jorge María Mejía (21 February 2001 - 9 December 2014)
Miguel Ángel Ayuso Guixot (5 October 2019 – present)

References

External links
 San Girolamo della Carità

Girolamo Carita
Titular churches
Girolamo Carita
Roman Catholic churches completed in 1657
1657 establishments in Italy
Churches of Rome (rione Regola)
Filippo Juvarra buildings